Dogface may refer to:

Dogface (TV series), UK sketch show
Dogface (military), US military term
Dogface (album), by Leash Law
DogFace (book), by Barbara O'Brien

Dogface may also refer to
Zerene, a genus of butterflies commonly known as the Dogfaces
Zerene cesonia, a butterfly in this genus commonly known as the Dogface or Southern Dogface
Sophie Reade, who temporarily had her name changed to Dogface to become a housemate on Big Brother 2009 (UK)
Dogfaces (comics), the name given to extras appearing in the Mickey Mouse universe.

Animal common name disambiguation pages